Travels with My Aunt may refer to:

 Travels with My Aunt, novel by Graham Greene
 Travels with My Aunt (film), 1972 adaptation directed by George Cukor
 Travels with My Aunt (play), 1991 adaptation by Giles Havergal